How To Make A Monster is the third compilation album by the American rock band the Cramps. Comprising rare, previously-unreleased tracks, the release is a 2-CD set that includes a 28-page book with extensive liner notes by members Lux Interior and Poison Ivy, as well as rare and previously unseen photos and flyers from their personal collection.

Content included
Disc 1 contains 1976 rehearsal material, some 1982 studio demos with Terry Graham of the Gun Club on drums, and several other previously unreleased studio recordings. Disc 2 contains two historic live performances of relatively poor recording quality, both from very early in the band's career (one at Max's Kansas City and the other at CBGB).

Track listing
All songs by Lux Interior and Poison Ivy Rorschach, except where otherwise noted

Disc 1
Summer 1976
1. "Quick Joey Small" (Joey Levine, Arthur Resnick) — 2:08
2. "Lux's Blues" — 1:14
3. "Love Me" (Marty Lott) — 2:56
4. "TV Set" — 3:12
5. "Love Me" (Marty Lott) — 2:29
6. "Domino" (Sam Phillips) — 2:34
7. "Sunglasses After Dark" (Dwight Pullen) — 1:16
8. "Subwire Desire" (Sam Phillips) — 2:50
October 1976
9. "I Was a Teenage Werewolf" — 3:08
10. "Can't Hardly Stand It" (Jody Chastain, Charlie Feathers, Jerry Huffman) — 3:21
1981 Rehearsal
11. "Sweet Woman Blues" (Edwin Bruce) — 4:54
12. "Rumble Blues" (Milt Grant, Link Wray) — 1:49
13. "Rumble Blues" (False Start) (Milt Grant, Link Wray) — 0:49
14. "Rumble Blues" (Milt Grant, Link Wray) — 3:28
15. "Rumble Blues" (Milt Grant, Link Wray) — 2:32
16. "Lonesome Town" (Baker Knight) — 4:13
1982 A&M Studio
17. "Five Years Ahead of My Time" (Rusty Evans, Vicky Pike) — 2:10
18. "Call of the Wighat" — 4:35
19. "Hanky Panky" (Jeff Barry, Ellie Greenwich) — 2:55
1988 Rehearsal
20. "Journey to the Center of a Girl" — 3:35
21. "Jackyard Backoff" — 3:04
22. "Everything Goes" — 1:53
1988 Home Demo
23. "All Women are Bad" — 3:47

Disc 2
Live at Max's Kansas City, 1/14/77
1. "Don't Eat Stuff Off the Sidewalk" — 2:06
2. "I Was a Teenage Werewolf" — 3:10
3. "Sunglasses After Dark" — 5:03
4. "Jungle Hop" — 2:20
5. "Domino" — 3:18
6. "Love Me" — 3:21
7. "Strychnine" — 4:19
8. "TV Set" — 3:25
9. "I'm Cramped" — 2:33
Live at CBGB, 1/13/78
10. "The Way I Walk" — 3:27
11. "Love Me" — 3:01
12. "Domino" — 3:39
13. "Human Fly" — 3:04
14. "I Was a Teenage Werewolf" — 3:25
15. "Sunglasses After Dark" — 4:43
16. "Can't Hardly Stand It" — 3:34
17. "Uranium Rock" — 3:02
18. "What's Behind the Mask" — 3:00
19. "Baby Blue Rock" — 3:01
20. "Subwire Desire" — 2:53
21. "I'm Cramped" — 2:51
22. "TV Set" — 3:38

Personnel
Lux Interior - vocals; guitar on "Lux's Blues"
Poison Ivy, Bryan Gregory (tracks 1-1 to 1-10, 2-1 to 2-22), Kid Congo Powers (tracks 1-11 to 1-19) - guitar
Candy Del Mar - bass (tracks 1-20 to 1-22)
Miriam Linna (tracks 1-9, 1-10, 2-1 to 2-9), Nick Knox (tracks 1-11 to 1-16, 1-20 to 1-22, 2-10 to 2-22), Pam Balam (tracks 1-1 to 1-8), Terry Graham (tracks 1-17 to 1-19) - drums
Technical
Earle Mankey - assembly and mastering

References

The Cramps albums
2004 compilation albums
2004 live albums